Robert Vintousky (19 June 1902 – 8 January 1995) was a French athlete. He competed in the men's pole vault at the 1928 Summer Olympics.

References

1902 births
1995 deaths
People from Beaune
Athletes (track and field) at the 1928 Summer Olympics
French male pole vaulters
Olympic athletes of France
Place of birth missing
Sportspeople from Côte-d'Or
20th-century French people